Michałówka  is a village in the administrative district of Gmina Biała Podlaska, within Biała Podlaska County, Lublin Voivodeship, in eastern Poland.

In 2005 the village had a population of 120.

References

Villages in Biała Podlaska County